Jung Suk-won (born May 16, 1985) is a South Korean actor. He began his entertainment career as a stuntman with the Seoul Action School after being discharged from the Marines, then turned to modeling and acting, notably in the television series Rooftop Prince, and Haeundae Lovers.

Personal life
Jung began dating singer Baek Ji-young in 2011, and the couple married on June 2, 2013 at the Sheraton Grande Walkerhill. On 22 May 2017, the couple's first child, a daughter named Jung Ha-im was born.

Filmography

Television series

Film

Variety show

Music video

Awards

References

External links

 
 
 Jung Suk-won at C-JeS Entertainment
 
 
 

People from Incheon
South Korean male television actors
South Korean male film actors
Living people
1985 births
Republic of Korea Marine Corps personnel